Boiardo is an Italian surname. 

Notable people with the surname include:

People
 House of Boiardo, an aristocratic house holding the Countdom of Scandiano
 Feltrino Boiardo, Count of Scandiano (15th century), father of Giulia Boiardo; grandfather of Giovanni Pico della Mirandola and Galeotto I Pico
 Giulia Boiardo (15th century), daughter of Feltrino Boiardo, Count of Scandiano; mother of Giovanni Pico della Mirandola and Galeotto I Pico
 Giulio Boiardo, Count of Scandiano (16th century) subject of the Niccolò dell'Abbate painting Portrait of a Couple
 Matteo Maria Boiardo (1440–1494), Italian Renaissance poet
 Carlo Bojardo, 15th century bishop of the Roman Catholic Archdiocese of Modena-Nonantola
 Nicolò Boiardo, 15th century bishop of the Roman Catholic Archdiocese of Modena-Nonantola
Richard Boiardo (1890–1984; born Ruggiero Boiardo), American mobster

Fictional characters
 Saverio Guerri "Boiardo", a character from the 2010s Italian web TV series Suburra: Blood on Rome

See also
 Boiardi, an Italian surname
 Bojardi, an Italian surname
 

Italian-language surnames